Dwayne A. King (born September 18, 1939) was an American politician.

King was born in Casselton, Cass County, North Dakota and was raised on a farm. He graduated from Lincoln High School, in Casselton, North Dakota, in 1957. King served in the United States Army in 1963 and 1964. He received his bachelor's degrees in mathematics and in civil engineering from University of North Dakota in 1961 and in 1965. King lived in Golden Valley, Minnesota with his wife and family. King worked for IBM as a staff instructor and as a system data processing engineer. King served in the Minnesota House of Representatives in 1977 and 1978 and was a Democrat.

References

1939 births
Living people
Military personnel from North Dakota
People from Cass County, North Dakota
People from Golden Valley, Minnesota
University of North Dakota alumni
IBM employees
Democratic Party members of the Minnesota House of Representatives